Očeslavci is a settlement in the hills south of Gornja Radgona in northeastern Slovenia.

References

External links
Očeslavci on Geopedia

Populated places in the Municipality of Gornja Radgona